Seán Keane may refer to:
Seán Keane (fiddler) (born 1946), fiddle player of The Chieftains
Seán Keane (singer) (born 1961), Irish folk singer; brother of singer Dolores Keane
Seán Keane (Irish politician) (1899–1953), Irish Labour Party politician represented Cork East

See also
Keane (disambiguation)